There has not been a government of England since 1707 when the Kingdom of England ceased to exist as a sovereign state, as it merged with the Kingdom of Scotland to form the Kingdom of Great Britain. The Kingdom of Great Britain continued from 1707 until 1801 when it merged with the Kingdom of Ireland to form the United Kingdom of Great Britain and Ireland, which itself became the United Kingdom of Great Britain and Northern Ireland (UK) in 1922 (in reality; in name in 1927) upon independence for most of the island of Ireland. The UK since then has gone through significant change to its system of government, with devolved parliaments, assemblies and governments in Scotland, Wales and Northern Ireland. England, however, remains under the full jurisdiction, on all matters, of the Parliament of the United Kingdom of Great Britain and Northern Ireland and the UK government as no devolved administration has been created for England within the new structure. This situation led to the anomaly, known as the West Lothian question, which is that Scottish Members of Parliament (MPs) have been able to vote on legislation that affects only England whereas English MPs have been unable to vote on certain Scottish matters due to devolution. In some cases, such as top-up university tuition fees and foundation hospitals, the votes of Scottish MPs have been crucial in helping pass legislation for England that the majority of English MPs have opposed. An attempt was made to address this anomaly in 2015 through the use of an English votes for English laws procedure which aims to ensure that legislation affecting only England requires a majority vote of MPs representing English constituencies.

Another possible solution to the West Lothian question would have been devolution to the English regions but attempts have been unsuccessful so far. Amongst the parts of England, Greater London has a degree of devolved power (although weaker than that of Scotland, Wales and Northern Ireland) with power vested in an elected Mayor of London, currently Sadiq Khan and the London Assembly. 

The country is therefore officially divided into the following in terms of governance:
 The nine English regions,
 The modern day local authority areas,
 The geographical/ceremonial counties of England.

The incumbent government has no plans to create a devolved English parliament.

'England only' government departments of the UK government

Several government departments of the UK government have responsibilities for matters affecting England alone:

 The Ministry of Housing, Communities and Local Government. 
 The Department for Education is responsible for issues affecting people in England up to the age of 19.
 The Department for Environment, Food and Rural Affairs (Defra) is responsible for environmental protection, food production and standards, agriculture, fisheries and rural communities in England.
 The Department of Health and Social Care, (DHSC) has responsibility for government policy on health, social care and the English National Health Service (NHS). 
 The Office for Standards in Education, Children's Services and Skills (Ofsted) which is a non-ministerial department headed by Her Majesty's Chief Inspector of Schools in England.

Other departments deal mainly with matters affecting England though they also have some UK wide responsibilities in certain areas;

 The Department for Transport
 The Department for Culture, Media and Sport
 The Charity Commission for England and Wales, which is a non-ministerial department

References

Further reading
Report on devolution and the governance of England, House of Commons Justice Committee, 24 May 2009

See also

Politics of England
West Lothian question
Devolved English parliament
List of parliaments of England
Campaign for an English Parliament